Michael Belfiore is an author and journalist. Some of his notable works include The Department of Mad Scientists: How DARPA is Remaking Our World, published by Smithsonian Books   Rocketeers, and The Way People Live - Life Aboard a Space Station. He has written numerous articles for Popular Mechanics and Popular Science

References

External links

American male writers
Year of birth missing (living people)
Living people